Dark World may refer to:
 Dark World (EP), a 2012 EP by Pity Sex
 Dark World (1935 film), a British film
 Dark World (2010 film), a Russian film
 Thor: The Dark World, a 2013 American superhero film
 The Dark World, a 1946 fantasy novel attributed to Henry Kuttner
 Dark World (game), 1992 fantasy board game based on the Dark Eye system
 The Dark World (1953 film), a 1953 Turkish biographical drama film
The Dark World, a location in the video game, The Legend of Zelda: A Link to the Past
 Dark World is a 2011 book written by paranormal investigator and leader of the Ghost Adventures crew, Zak Bagans.
 A location in the video game Deltarune

See also
World of Darkness (disambiguation)